Daniel Moszkowicz aka "Dawid Chone" and "Jerzy" (born 1905 in Warsaw - 1943 in Białystok, Poland) was a merchant, non-commissioned reserve officer of the Polish Army, communist and the co-leader of the Białystok Ghetto Uprising.

He was member of the Communist Party of Poland. During the German occupation of Poland he worked as a cobbler and baker in the ghetto of Białystok and was member of the Antyfaszystowska Organizacja Bojowa. (Anti-Fascist Military Organization). He was co-leader of the resistance during the first German attempt of liquidation of the ghetto in Białystok in January and February 1943. He also co-leading the Białystok Ghetto Uprising in August 1943.

Moszkowicz is believed to have committed suicide surrounded by German troops.

See also
 Mordechaj Tenenbaum

Awards
 Order of the Cross of Grunwald (III Class)

References

 Zofia Borzymińska, Rafał Żebrowski, Polski słownik judaistyczny, Warszawa 2003

1905 births
1943 deaths
Businesspeople from Warsaw
People from Warsaw Governorate
Communist Party of Poland politicians
Polish resistance members of World War II
Jewish resistance members during the Holocaust
Białystok Ghetto inmates
Jewish socialists